Armory Square is a small neighborhood on the west side of Downtown Syracuse, New York.  It began life as a busy commercial and industrial area just to the west of the central city.  After World War II, Syracuse's central city became less and less populated as more housing and business facilities were built in the suburbs.  In the 1980s, plans were first made to transform the languishing district into a small shopping/arts/nightlife district surrounding the former Syracuse Armory.  These plans came to fruition during the 1990s, when new stores and restaurants opened, and several new buildings were constructed in a compatible style to the middle and late 1800s and early 1900s architecture dominating the district.

Current day
Today, Armory Square is the home of some of Syracuse's better restaurants, at least two coffeehouses, a radio station company, dozens of small shops selling everything from band instruments to used records to women's clothing, several bars and nightclubs, Urban Outfitters, Armory Massage Therapy, a newly restored upscale hotel and two tattoo parlors. A number of professional firms are also located in Armory Square, including Eric Mower and Associates, O'Brien & Gere, and the Sugarman Law Firm. The area is popular with students from Syracuse University and Le Moyne College.

Its borders are generally considered to be the circular road around the armory (Jefferson Street) to the south, Onondaga Creek to the west, Washington Street to the north, and Clinton Street to the east.

Armory Square is also home to the Shot Clock Monument, which includes a 24-second shot clock whose invention, here, was crucial to the successful development of basketball as a major sport.

A paved multi-use trail, the Onondaga Creekwalk, connects the neighborhood with Onondaga Lake.

Armory Square Historic District

Forty-six industrial and commercial buildings make up the Armory Square Historic District.  West Fayette Street is the northern boundary of the district, the rear property lines of the buildings on South Clinton Street the eastern boundary. The southern boundary is a raised railroad track, while the western boundary includes the buildings on Walton Street. The buildings in the district include the Armory, a former Lackawanna Railroad passenger station (1941), hotels, warehouses and commercial buildings. The district was added to the National Register of Historic Places in 1984.

Contributing properties

References

External links

MOST
Then and Now: Armory Square

Neighborhoods in Syracuse, New York
Historic districts on the National Register of Historic Places in New York (state)
National Register of Historic Places in Syracuse, New York